Humera is a city in the Kafta Humera woreda in the Tigray Region of Ethiopia.

Humera may also refer to:

Female first name
Humera Arshad, Pakistani pop singer
Humera Channa, Pakistani playback singer
Humera Masroor (born 1967), Pakistani cricketer

Other uses
Humera Airport, an Ethiopian airport for the city of Humera
Humera Khan Institute of Management Studies and Research, a college in Mumbai, India

See also
Himera (disambiguation)
Humaira (disambiguation)
Humira, brand name of the medication adalimumab